Turi Widerøe (born 23 November 1937) is a Norwegian aviator who was the world's first female commercial air pilot for a major airline. The daughter of aviator Viggo Widerøe, (who founded, which today is Scandinavia's largest regional airline Widerøe), she was originally educated as a book designer. She later took a pilot's education, and, employed by Scandinavian Airlines System, became the first female pilot in a major airline in the western world. After ending her flight career she worked for numerous cultural institutions such as the Norwegian Broadcasting Corporation, Gyldendal, Oslo Nye Teater and Riksteatret.

Personal life
She was born in Oslo as a daughter of Viggo Widerøe (1904–2002) and Solveig Agnes Schrøder (1914–1989). Her father was a noted aviator who founded Widerøe's Flyveselskap A/S, a regional airline in Norway, in 1934. She was also a niece of noted engineer Rolf Widerøe.

Career
In 1958 she graduated as a book designer from the Norwegian National Academy of Arts and Crafts, following a four-year education. In the same year she was awarded for her design of Solveig Christov's book Valgets brodd. She worked two years for the printing presses Grøndahl & Søn and Aksjetrykkeriet, and from 1960 to 1964 she was assistant editor for National Association of Norwegian Architects's magazine Byggekunst. 

She then took her private pilot's license in 1962. After working with ore research for the mining company A/S Sydvaranger in Inner Troms, she acquired her commercial license in 1965. She flew Noorduyn Norseman and de Havilland Otter seaplanes and later Twin Otter on scheduled routes and mercy flights for Widerøe's Flyveselskap north of the Arctic Circle. 

In 1968, she was employed by SAS (Scandinavian Airlines System). After graduating from the company's Flight Academy in 1969, she was certified as co-pilot on Convair 440 Metropolitan and became the first female pilot in a major airline in the western world. She also flew SAS' first jet aircraft, the Caravelle, and the DC-9 before she ended her flying career.

In 1974 she wrote a 40th anniversary history of Widerøe's Flyveselskap, published as two articles in the Norwegian Airline Pilots Association's magazine Cockpit Forum. She had taken the initiative to Cockpit Forum's predecessor magazine Interno. 

In 1979, following the end of her flying career, she was given a fellowship in the Norwegian Broadcasting Corporation. She worked as a journalist and presenter there from 1980 to 1986, and from 1986 to 1988 she was an editor in the publishing house Gyldendal Norsk Forlag.  She was information director in Norsk forbund for fjernundervisning for several years, and around 2000 she worked with public information for Oslo Nye Teater and Riksteatret. 

In 2006 she took a master's degree in history at the University of Tromsø. Her thesis: Is fly og skip, deals with airborne and geophysical mapping of the Antarctic continent between 1929 and 1939.

Awards and legacy
Her first uniform is displayed in the National Air and Space Museum in Washington, D.C. In 1970, she was awarded the Harmon Aviatrix Trophy and the Amelia Earhart Medal by the Ninety-Nines. She received the FAI Paul Tissandier Diploma in Paris in 2005, on the 100 year anniversary of the aviation organization.

References

1937 births
Living people
Women aviators
Norwegian aviators
Widerøe people
SAS Group people
Norwegian illustrators
Norwegian magazine editors
NRK people
Oslo National Academy of the Arts alumni
University of Tromsø alumni
Artists from Oslo
Norwegian women aviators
Women magazine editors